Liolaemus quinterosi is a species of lizard in the family Liolaemidae. It is native to Argentina.

References

quinterosi
Reptiles described in 2019
Reptiles of Argentina
Endemic fauna of Argentina
Taxa named by María Soledad Ruiz
Taxa named by Cristian Simón Abdala